Standing Cavalier is a painting by Judith Leyster in the Royal Collection. It is the only painting by Leyster with a provenance that reaches back to the 18th-century.

Provenance
The painting was acquired by George III for his collection as by Jacob Jordaens in 1762 from Consul Smith. It was first attributed to Frans Hals by Wilhelm von Bode in 1883 and was listed in Hals catalogs until W.R. Valentiner and Numa S. Trivas rejected the Hals attribution and called it "a study". It was missed by Harms in 1927 and Seymour Slive identified it as by Leyster, listing it along with a California copy and an Amsterdam drawing as studies for the Hals portrait Willem van Heythuysen posing with a sword. The painting is unsigned but dated five years after the Hals portrait, based on the biographical details of Leyster, combined with the visual evidence that the two paintings are clearly related.

According to Hofrichter, the drapery is echoed in Leyster's Carousing Couple.

See also
List of paintings by Judith Leyster
List of paintings by Frans Hals

References

1633 paintings
Paintings by Judith Leyster
Paintings in the Royal Collection of the United Kingdom